Mitragyna speciosa (commonly known as kratom, an herbal leaf from a tree of the Rubiaceae family) is a tropical evergreen tree in the coffee family native to Southeast Asia. It is indigenous to Thailand, Indonesia, Malaysia, Myanmar, and Papua New Guinea, where it has been used in herbal medicine since at least the nineteenth century. It has also historically been used for chewing, smoking, and tea. Kratom has opioid properties and some stimulant-like effects.

, the efficacy and safety of kratom are unclear, and the drug was not approved as a therapeutic agent in the United States due to the poor quality of the research. In 2019, the United States Food and Drug Administration (FDA) stated that there is no evidence that kratom is safe or effective for treating any condition. Some people take it for managing chronic pain, for treating opioid withdrawal symptoms, or for recreational purposes. The onset of effects typically begins within five to ten minutes and lasts for two to five hours.

Anecdotal reports describe increased alertness, physical energy, talkativeness, sociability, sedation, changes in mood, and pain relief following kratom use at various doses. Common side effects include appetite loss, erectile dysfunction, nausea and constipation. More severe side effects may include respiratory depression (decreased breathing), seizure, addiction, and psychosis. Other side effects may include high heart rate and blood pressure, trouble sleeping, and, rarely, liver toxicity. When use is stopped, withdrawal symptoms may occur. Scores of deaths have been attributed to the use of kratom, both by itself and mixed with other substances. Serious toxicity is relatively rare and generally appears at high doses or when kratom is used with other substances.

As of 2018, kratom is a controlled substance in 16 countries and, in 2014, the FDA banned importing and manufacturing of kratom as a dietary supplement. , there is growing international concern about a possible threat to public health from kratom use, while others have argued that it could be a tool to help the opioid crisis. In 2021, the World Health Organization's Executive Committee on Drug Dependency investigated the risks of kratom and declined to recommend a ban following a scientific review. The committee, however, recommended kratom be kept "under surveillance." In some jurisdictions, its sale and importation have been restricted, and several public health authorities have raised alerts.

Description 

Its trunk may grow to a  diameter. The trunk is generally straight, and the outer bark is smooth and grey. They have 12 to 17 pairs of veins. The spherical inflorescences, which are deep yellow, grow in clusters of three at the ends of the branches.

Mitragyna speciosa is indigenous to Thailand, Indonesia, Malaysia, Myanmar, and Papua New Guinea. It was first formally described by the Dutch colonial botanist Pieter Korthals in 1839, who named it Stephegyne speciosa; it was renamed and reclassified several times before George Darby Haviland provided the final name and classification in 1859.

Uses

, kratom has been studied in cells and in animals, but no clinical trials have been conducted in the United States. The U.S. Drug Enforcement Administration (DEA) stated in 2013 that there is no legitimate medical use for kratom, and in 2019, the U.S. Food and Drug Administration (FDA) said that there is no evidence that kratom is safe or effective for treating any condition, and that there are no approved clinical uses for kratom.

Kratom is commonly ingested by chewing, as a tea, powdered in capsules or pills, or extracted for use in liquids. Kratom is rarely smoked. Different varieties of kratom contain different relative proportions of alkaloids such as Mitragynine.

Traditional use
In cultures where the plant grows, kratom has been used in traditional medicine. The leaves are chewed to relieve musculoskeletal pain and increase energy, appetite, and sexual desire in ways similar to khat and coca. The leaves, or extracts from them, are used to heal wounds and as a local anesthetic. Extracts and leaves have been used to treat coughs, diarrhea, and intestinal infections. They are also used as intestinal deworming agents in Thailand.

Kratom is often used by workers in laborious or monotonous professions to stave off exhaustion, and as a mood-enhancer and painkiller. In Thailand, kratom was "used as a snack to receive guests and was part of the ritual worship of ancestors and gods". The herb is bitter and is generally combined with a sweetener.

Opioid withdrawal
, there have been no formal trials to study the efficacy or safety of kratom to treat opioid addiction. Kratom is not approved for this or any other medical use. However, because the withdrawal effects of kratom are often reported to be less severe than those associated with traditional opioids, some people use kratom in the attempt to manage opioid use disorder. Stanciu et al. conducted a review of all literature and found insufficient evidence for any conclusions concerning whether kratom is harmful or whether can serve as harm reduction for those with opioid addiction.  While some literature reviews claim that kratom has less potential for dependence or overdose than traditional opioids, other reviews note that kratom withdrawal itself can still be quite severe.

Data on how widely it is used worldwide are lacking, as it is not detected by typical drug-screening tests. Rates of kratom use appear to be increasing among those who have been self-managing chronic pain with opioids purchased without a prescription and are cycling (but not quitting) their opioid use.

In 1836, kratom was reported to have been used as an opium substitute in Malaysia. Kratom was also used as an opium substitute in Thailand in the nineteenth century.

Recreational uses
At low doses, kratom produces euphoric effects comparable to coca. At higher doses, kratom produces opioid-like effects. The onset of effects typically begins within five to ten minutes and lasts for two to five hours. Some anecdotal reports describe increased work capacity, alertness, talkativeness, sociability, increased sexual desire, positive mood, and euphoria following the consumption of kratom.

According to the U.S. DEA and a 2020 survey, kratom is used to alleviate pain, anxiety, depression, or opioid withdrawal.

In Thailand, a 2007 survey found that the lifetime, past year, and past 30 days kratom consumption rates were 2.32%, 0.81% and 0.57%, respectively, among respondents aged 12–65 years, and that kratom was the most widely used recreational drug in Thailand.

Kratom may be mixed with other psychoactive drugs, such as caffeine and codeine. Starting in the 2010s, a tea-based cocktail known as "4×100"  became popular among some young people across Southeast Asia and especially in Thailand. It is a mix of kratom leaves, cough syrup, Coca-Cola, and ice. Around 2011, people who consumed the cocktail were often viewed more negatively than users of traditional kratom, but not as negatively as users of heroin.  , use of the cocktail was a severe problem among youth in three provinces along the border of Malaysia and southern Thailand.

In the U.S., kratom was available in outlets such as head shops and over the Internet; the prevalence of its U.S. use was unknown at the time. In the United States, kratom use increased rapidly between 2011 and 2017. By 2020, it was estimated that 15 million people in the U.S. use kratom.

Adverse effects

Mitragyna speciosa may cause many adverse effects and in November 2017 the FDA  issued a public health advisory for the drug. The side effects of kratom appear to be dose-dependent and are more common with doses that exceed 8 g. While the incidence of adverse effects in people who use kratom is unknown, a 2019 review of 935 kratom exposures reported to U.S. poison control centers over a seven-year period listed the following signs and symptoms: agitation (18.6%), tachycardia (16.9%), drowsiness (13.6%), vomiting (11.2%), confusion (8.1%), seizure (6.1%), withdrawal (6.1%), hallucinations (4.8%), respiratory depression (2.8%), coma (2.3%), and cardiac or respiratory arrest (0.6%). The study also reported two deaths and four cases of neonatal abstinence syndrome. A different 2019 review listed as common side effects: decreased appetite, anorexia, weight loss, temporary erectile dysfunction, insomnia, sweating, hyperpigmentation, hair loss, tremor, and constipation.

Kratom products in the U.S. are commonly used in doses ranging from 2–6 g of dried leaf per dose, and doses exceeding 8 g are relatively uncommon. Given that kratom products may vary greatly in potency, there is no standard dosing system. At relatively low doses (1–5 g of raw leaves), at which there are mostly stimulant effects, side effects include contracted pupils and blushing; adverse effects related to stimulation include anxiety and agitation, and opioid-related effects like itching, nausea, loss of appetite, and increased urination begin to appear. At moderate to high doses (5–15 g of raw leaves), at which opioid effects generally appear, additional adverse effects include tachycardia (an increased stimulant effect) as well as the opioid side effects of constipation, dizziness, hypotension, dry mouth, and sweating.

Long-term use of high doses of kratom may lead to development of tolerance, dependence, and withdrawal symptoms, including loss of appetite, weight loss, decreased sexual drive, trouble sleeping, muscle spasms, muscle and bone pain, myoclonus, watery eyes, hot flushes, fever, diarrhea, restlessness, anger, and sadness. This may lead to resumption of use.

Frequent use of high doses of kratom may cause tremors, anorexia, weight loss, seizures, and psychosis. However, in case reports associating kratom use with psychosis, it remains unclear whether kratom use directly caused psychosis or simply unmasked the condition. Serious toxicity is relatively rare and generally appears at high doses or when kratom is used with other substances. Herb-drug interactions may result when kratom is combined with alcohol, sedatives, benzodiazepines, opioids, caffeine, cocaine, yohimbine, or monoamine oxidase inhibitors (MAOIs). Rhabdomyolysis is one of the rare and serious complications of this herb at high dosage.

In July 2016, the Centers for Disease Control issued a report stating that between 2010 and 2015, US poison control centers received 660 reports of exposure to kratom. Medical outcomes associated with kratom exposure were reported as minor (minimal signs or symptoms, which resolved rapidly with no residual disability) for 162 (24.5%) exposures, moderate (non-life-threatening, with no residual disability, but requiring some form of treatment) for 275 (41.7%) exposures, and major (life-threatening signs or symptoms, with some residual disability) for 49 (7.4%) exposures. Overall, 92.6% of outcomes were resolved with no residual disability. One death was reported in a person who was exposed to the medications paroxetine (an antidepressant) and lamotrigine (an anticonvulsant and mood stabilizer) in addition to kratom. For 173 (26.2%) exposure calls, no effects were reported, or poison center staff members were unable to follow up  regarding effects.

A 2019 report from the American Association of Poison Control Centers (AAPCC) noted that kratom use was increasing rapidly, with 1807 kratom exposures and a 52-fold increase occurring over the years 2011 to 2017. Most exposures occurred intentionally by adult males in their homes, with 32% of the incidents requiring admission to a health care facility and half of the admissions as a serious medical condition. Multiple-substance exposures were associated with a higher number of hospitalizations than kratom-only exposures, and involved 11 deaths, including two due to kratom alone. Post-mortem toxicology testing detected multiple substances for almost all those who died, with fentanyl and fentanyl analogs being the most frequently identified co-occurring substances.

Overdoses of kratom are managed similarly to opioid overdoses, and naloxone can be considered to treat an overdose that results in a reduced impulse to breathe, despite mixed results for its utility, based on animal models.

From October 2017 to February 2018 in the United States, 28 people in 20 different states were infected with salmonella, an outbreak linked to the consumption of contaminated pills, powder, tea or unidentified sources of kratom. An analytical method using whole genome sequencing applied to samples from the infected users indicated that the salmonella outbreak likely had a common kratom source.

Addiction
Kratom is a botanical with a known addiction liability and, in vulnerable individuals, dependence may develop rather quickly with tolerance noted at 3 months and 4- to 10-fold dose escalations required within the first few weeks.  Kratom addiction carries a relapse risk as high as 78% to 89% at 3 months post-cessation.
   In cases of severe addiction, a similar approach to treatment of opioid addiction may be warranted.

Respiratory depression
Respiratory depression is the leading cause of death from opioid use. Although evidence is sparse, the risk of respiratory depression caused by taking Mitragyna speciosa appears to be low, but  the Food and Drug Administration listed respiratory depression as a concern. Confusingly, a 2018 review found that the alkaloids in kratom do not induce respiratory depression.

Liver toxicity
In rare cases, though with a dangerous delay, kratom use has been linked to acute liver injury, with symptoms of abdominal discomfort, dark urine, itching and jaundice. Liver injury has been reported with a latency (time from first use to onset of symptoms) of median 20.6 days. Reported liver biopsies tend to show cholestasis; however, blood biomarkers can show a range of cholestatic, mixed, or hepatocellular injury pattern. The majority of users do not seem to develop liver injury, and it is unclear which users are at heightened risk. The mechanism by which kratom causes liver damage in some people is unknown and poorly studied, but a model has been proposed.

Death
Kratom overdose is a subject of concern in many countries because of the associated rising number of hospitalizations and deaths in which chronic kratom use is a contributing factor. According to clinical reviews, a kratom overdose can cause liver toxicity, seizures, coma, and death, especially in combination with excessive alcohol use. Between 2011 and 2017, 44 U.S. deaths were kratom-related. However, many cases could not be fully assessed, due to limited information. People who die from kratom use typically have taken it in combination with other substances, or have underlying health conditions.

Over 18 months in 2016 and 2017, 152 overdose deaths involving kratom were reported in the United States, with kratom as the primary overdose agent in 91 of the deaths, and 7 with kratom being the only agent detected. Nine deaths occurred in Sweden during 2010–11 relating to use of Krypton, a mixture of kratom, caffeine and O-desmethyltramadol, a prescription opioid analgesic.

Pharmacology

Kratom contains at least 54 alkaloids. These include mitragynine, 7-hydroxymitragynine (7-HMG), speciociliatine, paynantheine, corynantheidine, speciogynine, mitraphylline, rhynchophylline, mitralactonal, raubasine, and mitragynaline. The alkaloids mitragynine and 7-hydroxymitragynine are responsible for many of the complex effects of kratom, but other alkaloids may also contribute synergistically.

Both mitragynine and 7-HMG are partial agonists of the μ-opioid receptor and competitive antagonists of the δ-opioid receptor with low affinity for the κ-opioid receptor. 7-HMG appears to have higher affinity at the μ-opioid receptor than mitragynine. These compounds display functional selectivity and do not activate the β-arrestin pathway partly responsible for the respiratory depression, constipation, and sedation associated with traditional opioids. Both mitragynine and 7-HMG readily cross the blood-brain barrier.

Mitragynine also appears to inhibit COX-2, block L-type and T-type calcium channels, and interact with other receptors in the brain including 5-HT2C and 5-HT7 serotonin receptors, D2 dopamine receptors, and A2A adenosine receptors. Mitragynine stimulates α2-adrenergic receptors, inhibiting the release of norepinephrine (noradrenaline); other compounds in this class include dexmedetomidine, which is used for sedation, and clonidine, which is used to manage anxiety and some symptoms of opioid withdrawal. This activity might explain why kratom can be dangerous when used in combination with other sedatives. Kratom also contains rhynchophylline, a non-competitive NMDA receptor antagonist.

Mitragynine is metabolized in humans via phase I and phase II mechanisms with the resulting metabolites excreted in urine. In in vitro experiments, kratom extracts inhibited CYP3A4, CYP2D6, and CYP1A2 enzymes, which results in significant potential for drug interactions.

Chemistry 

Many of the key psychoactive compounds in M. speciosa are indole alkaloids related to mitragynine, which is a tetracyclic relative of the pentacyclic indole alkaloids, yohimbine and voacangine. In particular, mitragynine and 7-hydroxymitragynine (7-HMG) compose significant proportions of the natural products isolable from M. speciosa; e.g., in one study, mitragynine was 12% by weight from Malaysian leaf sources, versus 66% from Thai sources, and 7-hydroxymitragynine constituted ~2% by weight. In addition, at least 40 other compounds have been isolated from M. speciosa leaves, including ~25 additional alkaloids, including raubasine/ajmalicine (originally isolated from Rauvolfia serpentina), corynantheidine (also found in Pausinystalia johimbe), as well as mitraphylline, mitragynine pseudoindoxyl, and rhynchophylline.

In addition to alkaloids, M. speciosa produces many other secondary metabolites. These include various saponins, iridoids and other monoterpenoids, triterpenoids such as ursolic acid and oleanic acid, as well as various polyphenols including the flavonoids apigenin and quercetin. Although some of these compounds possess antinociceptive, anti-inflammatory, gastrointestinal, antidepressant, antioxidant, and antibacterial effects in cells and non-human animals, there is no sufficient evidence to support the clinical use of kratom in humans.

Detection in body fluids
The plant's active compounds and metabolites are not detected by a typical drug screening test, but can be detected by more specialized testing. Blood mitragynine concentrations are expected to be in a range of 10–50 μg/L in persons using the drug recreationally. Detection in body fluids is typically by liquid chromatography-mass spectrometry.

Regulation
, neither the plant nor its alkaloids were listed in any of the Schedules of the United Nations Drug Conventions.

ASEAN
, kratom was listed by ASEAN in its annex of products that cannot be included in traditional medicines and health supplements that are traded across ASEAN nations.

Australia and New Zealand
, kratom was controlled as a narcotic in Australia and under Medicines Regulations 1985 (Amended August 6, 2015) in New Zealand.

Canada
, Health Canada disallowed marketing of kratom for any use by ingestion, and has taken action against companies marketing it for such purposes. Kratom could be marketed for other uses, such as incense.

Europe
, the plant was controlled in Denmark, Latvia, Lithuania, Poland, Romania and Sweden. In the UK, since 2016, the sale, import, and export of kratom are prohibited under the Psychoactive Substances Act.

In 2017, kratom was designated a Schedule 1 illegal drug (the highest level) in the Republic of Ireland, under the names 7-hydroxymitragynine and mitragynine.

Indonesia 
Kratom is scheduled to become an illegal substance in Indonesia in 2024 once new regulations from the Indonesian National Narcotics Agency (BNN) go into effect. This pending ban has been in place since 2019; the date of the ban going into effect was pushed out to 2024 to give Kratom farmers time to switch to other crops. Notably, this ban would likely devastate the Kratom supply in the United States, since almost all of America's Kratom is supplied via Indonesian exports.

Malaysia
The use of kratom leaves, known locally as ketum or Biak is prohibited to use, import, export, manufacture, compound, mix, dispense, sell, supply, administer or possess in Malaysia under Section 30 (3), Act. 366 Poisons Act 1952 and will be punished by imprisonment or fine or both. Although prohibited by statute, the use of kratom remains widely spread especially in Northern and East Coast region of Malaysia's Peninsula because the tree grows natively and tea decoctions are readily available in local communities. Certain parties have urged the government to penalize the use of kratom under the Dangerous Drugs Act instead of the Poisons Act, which would carry heavier penalties.

Thailand
Possession of kratom leaves was illegal in Thailand until 2018. The Thai government had passed the Kratom Act 2486, effective 3 August 1943, which made planting the tree illegal, in response to a rise in its use when opium became very expensive in Thailand and the Thai government was attempting to gain control of the opium market.  In 1979, the Thai government placed kratom, along with marijuana, in Category V of a five category classification of narcotics.  Kratom accounted for less than two percent of arrests for narcotics between 1987 and 1992.

The Thai government has considered legalizing kratom for recreational use in 2004, 2009, 2013, and 2020. In 2018, Thailand became the first Southeast Asian country to legalize kratom for medical purposes. In 2021, Thailand fully legalized kratom and removed it from the list of Category V narcotics, and more than 12,000 people who had been convicted for kratom-related offences when it was still considered a narcotic were granted an amnesty.

United States
In the United States, there is consideration to make kratom a Schedule I drug. In 2019, the FDA warned consumers that kratom remains unapproved for interstate commerce, may be unsafe in commercially available products, and is on an import alert which can lead to confiscation of imported supplies. Efforts to schedule kratom have generated significant controversy both among the general public and scientific community.

FDA assessment 
In April 2019, the FDA issued a statement declaring that kratom was not approved for any medical use, was potentially unsafe in commercial products available in the United States, and remained on an import alert where imported supplies would be confiscated.
On April 4, 2018, the FDA issued the first mandatory recall in its history over concerns of salmonella contamination of several kratom-containing products. Samples of the products, manufactured by Triangle Pharmanaturals, and marketed under the brand name 'Raw Form Organics', tested positive for contamination and the manufacturer did not comply with federal requests for voluntary recall.  FDA Commissioner Gottlieb stated that the recall was, "...based on the imminent health risk posed by the contamination of this product with salmonella" and not related to other regulatory concerns.  Consumers were advised to immediately discard any such products to prevent serious health risks.

In February 2018, the commissioner of the FDA, Scott Gottlieb, released a statement describing further opioid-like properties of kratom and stating that it should not be used for any medical treatment or recreational use. Also in 2018, the FDA supervised the voluntary destruction of kratom dietary supplements by a nationwide distributor in Missouri, and encouraged all companies involved in kratom commerce to remove their products from the market. On February 26, the FDA warned a California manufacturer of a kratom product called "Mitrasafe" that the supplement was not confirmed as safe, was not approved as a dietary supplement or drug, and was illegal for interstate commerce.

In November 2017, the FDA cited serious concerns over the marketing and effects (including death) associated with the use of kratom in the United States, stating that "There is no reliable evidence to support the use of kratom as a treatment for opioid use disorder; there are currently no FDA-approved therapeutic uses of kratom... and the FDA has evidence to show that there are significant safety issues associated with its use."

DEA scheduling 
On August 30, 2016, the Drug Enforcement Administration (DEA) announced its intention to place the active materials in the kratom plant into Schedule I of the Controlled Substances Act as a warning about an imminent hazard to public safety, citing over 600 calls to poison control centers between 2010 and 2015 and 15 kratom-related deaths between 2014 and 2016. This drew strong protests among those using kratom to deal with chronic pain or wean themselves off opioids or alcohol.  A group of 51 members of the U.S. House of Representatives and a group of nine Senators each sent letters to acting DEA administrator Chuck Rosenberg protesting the listing and around 140,000 people signed an online White House Petition protesting it.  The DEA noted the responses but said that it intended to go forward with the listing; a spokesman said: "We can't rely upon public opinion and anecdotal evidence. We have to rely upon science." In October 2016, the DEA withdrew its notice of intent while inviting public comments over a review period ending on December 1, 2016. As of July 2016, Alabama, Arkansas, Indiana, Vermont, and Wisconsin had made kratom illegal, and the US Army had forbidden soldiers from using it. Between February 2014 and July 2016, U.S. law-enforcement authorities "encountered 55 tons of kratom," or roughly "50 million individual doses," according to the International Narcotics Control Board.

Public response 
The FDA's arguments for the federal prohibition of kratom have drawn both criticism and support. FDA commissioner Gottlieb responded to criticism in 2018 by stating that “The FDA has done an exhaustive review of adverse event reports, clinical literature and other sources of information related to kratom." However, in 2021, former Acting Commissioner of Food and Drugs Brett Giroir claimed that the FDA's recommendation to schedule kratom was rejected because of "embarrassingly poor evidence [and] data." The FDA's position on kratom has also been criticized by the American Kratom Association and researchers including Walter Prozialeck. Former commissioner Gottlieb continued to defend the agency's position in 2021, stating that he was convinced that kratom was fueling the U.S. opioid epidemic, though Gottlieb's partiality has been called into question as he has since gone on to become a member of the board of directors of Pfizer Inc., a company that has been heavily criticized for its sale and marketing of opioid drugs.

Research 
Kratom is under preliminary research for its possible antipsychotic and antidepressant properties. Survey studies found that some people use kratom as a self-treatment strategy for conditions such as opioid use disorder, acute pain, chronic pain, and various mental health conditions, including anxiety and depression. Kratom is also being studied in order to design novel drugs for treating pain, opioid use disorder, and alcohol use disorder. Further clinical research is necessary to corroborate anecdotal reports of kratom as an effective treatment for chronic pain, and to determine whether it is a safe or effective treatment for illness.

See also 

 Pausinystalia johimbe

References

External links 

 Kratom (Mitragyna speciosa), from the European Monitoring Centre for Drugs and Drug Addiction, January 2015

Analgesics
Antidepressants
Antidiarrhoeals
Euphoriants
Medicinal plants
Opioids
Naucleeae
Trees of Indo-China
Trees of Malesia
Trees of New Guinea